Nathanael Cousins is a U.S. Magistrate Judge of the United States District Court for the Northern District of California.

Education
Cousins graduated from Stanford University in 1992, where he received a degree in political science, and obtained his Juris Doctor degree from University of California Hastings College of the Law in 1995, where he was an editor on the Hastings Constitutional Law Quarterly and earned membership in the Order of the Coif. Cousins has also studied abroad at Novosibirsk University in Russia and the University of Leiden in the Netherlands.

Career
Upon graduation from law school, Cousins started his career as an Associate focusing on civil litigation at the Los Angeles office of Greenberg Glusker.

Clerkship
After working at Greenberg and Glusker, Cousins served as a federal judicial law clerk for the Honorable F.A. Little Jr., then Chief U.S. District Judge of the U.S. District Court for the Western District of Louisiana.

Law firm private practice
After his clerkship, Cousins joined the Chicago office of Kirkland & Ellis as an Associate and then became Partner after practicing at the firm for over six years. While in private practice, he focused on both civil and criminal litigation in the areas of civil rights, antitrust law, class actions, securities fraud, and consumer fraud. He also served as a pro bono class counsel for inmates in an Illinois state prison.

Department of Justice
Upon completing his work in private practice, Cousins then joined the Antitrust Division of the United States Department of Justice (or the United States Department of Justice Antitrust Division) as an Antitrust Division Trial Attorney, where he prosecuted criminal antitrust cases for five years.

After his work with the United States Department of Justice Antitrust Division, Cousins joined the Office of the U.S. Attorney for the Northern District of California in 2008 as an Assistant U.S. Attorney in the San Jose and San Francisco divisions.

In both of the above positions, Cousins led criminal jury trials before many of the judges of the Northern District of California and was also part of the legal team that prosecuted global price-fixing cartels in semiconductor memory chip markets. He also coordinated Operation Ceasefire, a community program designed to reduce gang violence in Monterey County, California.

Judicial service
Cousins was appointed on July 5, 2011. He assumed the vacant seat left by retiring U.S. Magistrate Judge Bernard Zimmerman.

Cousins also has chambers in San Jose but has served in each and every courthouse in the Northern District of California, from Eureka to Salinas. He has also taught antitrust, legal writing and appellate advocacy (moot court) at the University of California Hastings College of the Law, his alma mater, and regularly participates in moot court and trial training programs at various law schools in the San Francisco Bay Area. He additionally coaches basketball and soccer.

See also
United States District Court for the Northern District of California
United States Court of Appeals for the Ninth Circuit

References

External links
The Honorable Nathanael Cousins, U.S. Magistrate Judge, United States District Court for the Northern District of California
Ballotpedia: Judge Nathanael Cousins

Living people
American lawyers
Stanford University alumni
United States magistrate judges
People from San Jose, California
21st-century American judges
University of California, Hastings College of the Law alumni
Year of birth missing (living people)
People associated with Kirkland & Ellis